Karen Haber (born January 9, 1955) is an American science fiction and non-fiction author and editor, as well as an art critic and historian. She is the author of nine novels including Star Trek Voyager: Bless the Beasts, and co-author of Science of the X-Men. Other publications include Exploring the Matrix: Visions of the Cyber Present, a collection of essays by leading science fiction writers and artists, and Transitions with Todd Lockwood, a retrospective of the artist's work.  In 2001 she edited a Hugo-nominated essay collection celebrating J. R. R. Tolkien, Meditations on Middle-Earth. Her short fiction has appeared in Asimov's Science Fiction magazine, the Magazine of Fantasy and Science Fiction, and many anthologies. She reviews art books for Locus magazine and profiles artists for various publications including Realms of Fantasy. With her husband, Robert Silverberg, she co-edited Best Science Fiction of 2001, 2002, and the Best Fantasy of 2001 and 2002 for ibooks and later, co-edited the continuation with Jonathan Strahan.

Bibliography

Short stories
 Madre De Dios (1988)
Batman in Nighttown (1989) (with Robert Silverberg)
 A Plague of Strangers (1989)		
 Inside Out (1992)		
 Red Angels (1993)	
 The Shores of Morning (1993, in The Further Adventures of Wonder Woman)
 My Husband Became a Zombie and it Saved Our Marriage (1994)		
 On the Tip of a Cat's Tongue (1994)		
 Doing the Angry Centipede (1995)		
 First Contact, Sort of (1995) (with Carol Carr)		
 The King Who Would Fly (1995)		
 A Round of Cards with the General (1995)		
 The Spell Between Worlds (1995)		
 The Vampire of the Opera (1995)		
 A Bone Dry Place (1996)		
 Cézanne Was a Capricorn (1997)		
 The Glyptodon's Quadrille (1997)
 Dog Is My Copilot (1998)		
 A Killing Light (1999) (with Robert Silverberg)		
 The Federal Spy And Miz Julia (2000)

Novels
 Thieves' Carnival (1990)
 Bless the Beasts (Star Trek: Voyager series, 1996)
 Crossing Infinity (2005)

Series

Fire in Winter
 The Mutant Season (1989) (with Robert Silverberg)
 The Mutant Prime (1990)
 Mutant Star (1992)
 Mutant Legacy (1992)

War Minstrels
 Woman without a Shadow (1995)
 The War Minstrels (1995)
 Sister Blood (1996)

Non-fiction
 Science of the X-Men (2000) (with Link Yaco)
 The Art of Todd Lockwood: Transitions (2003)
 Kong Unbound (2005)

Editing
 Universe 1 (1990) (with Robert Silverberg)
 Universe 2 (1992) (with Robert Silverberg)
 Universe 3 (1994) (with Robert Silverberg)
 Meditations on Middle-earth, essay collection celebrating J.R.R. Tolkien (Earthlight, 2001)
 Fantasy: The Best of 2001 (2002) (with Robert Silverberg)
 Scientific American's Secrets of the Periodic Table (2002)
 Science Fiction: The Best of 2003 (2003) (with Jonathan Strahan)
 Fantasy: The Best of 2002 (2003) (with Robert Silverberg)
 Exploring the Matrix: Visions of the Cyber Present, a collection of essays by leading sf authors (St. Martin's Press, 2003)
 Fantasy: The Best of 2004 (2005) (with Jonathan Strahan)
 Science Fiction: The Best of 2004 (2005) (with Jonathan Strahan)
 Science Fiction: The Best of 2005 (2006)
 Fantasy: The Best of 2005 (2006) (with Jonathan Strahan)

Awards
Meditations on Middle Earth was nominated for the Hugo Award for Best Related Book in 2002.

References

External links
 Official website

1955 births
Living people
20th-century American novelists
21st-century American novelists
American science fiction writers
American women short story writers
American women novelists
American speculative fiction editors
American speculative fiction critics
Science fiction editors
Women science fiction and fantasy writers
20th-century American women writers
21st-century American women writers
20th-century American short story writers
21st-century American short story writers
American women non-fiction writers
20th-century American non-fiction writers
21st-century American non-fiction writers
Women speculative fiction editors